Hinton Skydiving Centre is a BPA affiliated parachuting centre and skydiving drop zone at the Hinton-in-the-Hedges Airfield, on the west side of Hinton-in-the-Hedges, Northamptonshire, England.

Aircraft operated include a pac 750-xl. The centre provides student training in Accelerated Freefall and Tandem skydiving. The drop zone has a kit store onsite.

References

External links

Parachuting in the United Kingdom
Sport in Northamptonshire